Mini Akıllı Mühimmat (MAM), meaning "smart micro munition" is a family of laser-guided and/or GPS/INS guided bombs produced by Turkish defence industry manufacturer Roketsan.

MAM has been developed for unmanned aerial vehicles (UAV), light attack aircraft, fighter aircraft and air–ground missions for low-payload-capacity air platforms. MAM can engage both stationary and moving targets with high precision.

Combat use 
Operations in which the munitions have been used:
Syrian Civil War
 Operation Euphrates Shield
 Operation Olive Branch
 EFES 2018 Exercises
Kurdish-Turkish War
Operation Claw
 Operation Peace Spring, 2019
 Operation Spring Shield, 2020
2020 Nagorno-Karabakh war
Central Libya offensive
Russo-Ukrainian War
2022 Russian invasion of Ukraine
Tigray War

Technical specifications

Users 

 
 Government of National Accord

Mountable vehicles 

Bayraktar Akıncı
Bayraktar TB2
TAI Aksungur
TAI Anka
TAI Hürkuş (basic trainer and ground attack aircraft for the Turkish Armed Forces)
Vestel Karayel

See also 

 ASELSAN
 Baykar
 Desert Sting
 Roketsan Cirit
 Scientific and Technological Research Council of Turkey
 Turkish Aerospace Industries

References

Rockets and missiles
Military equipment introduced in the 2010s